The second season of JAG premiered on CBS on January 3, 1997, and concluded on April 18, 1997. The season, starring David James Elliott and Catherine Bell, was produced by Belisarius Productions in association with Paramount Television.

The first season of JAG aired on NBC and JAG began its second season on CBS as a mid-season replacement for Mr. & Mrs. Smith.

Plot 

By-the-book Marine Major Sarah "Mac" MacKenzie (Catherine Bell) and Lieutenant Commander Harmon "Harm" Rabb, Jr. (David James Elliott), a former naval aviator, work at the Headquarters of the Judge Advocate General, the internal law firm of the Department of the Navy. Now stationed out of Falls Church, Virginia, they prosecute, defend, and investigate a plethora of cases including the theft of the Declaration of Independence by a right-wing militia ("We the People"), a brig-break ("Secrets"), superstition in a flying squadron as planes crash supposedly due to the bombing of a mosque during the 1991 Gulf War ("Jinx"), and a sexual harassment allegation by a female fighter pilot ("Crossing the Line"). Meanwhile, Harm finds himself in hot-water when he fires a machine gun during a tense courtroom battle ("Heroes"), Mac hones her Russian language skills ("Cowboys & Cossacks"), and Rear Admiral A.J. Chegwidden (John M. Jackson) becomes the target of a serial killer from his past ("Ghosts"). Also this season, Lieutenant junior grade Bud Roberts (Patrick Labyorteaux) joins JAG at the behest of outgoing Lieutenant Meg Austin (Tracey Needham) ("We the People"), Mac confronts her past ("Rendezvous"), and Harm goes undercover as a Gunnery Sergeant ("Force Recon").

Production 
For its second season, JAG moved from NBC to CBS. Donald P. Bellisario had previously received offers from CBS and ABC to pick up the series, which was reworked to be one of both "legal [drama] and action". Following the departure of series co-star Tracey Needham, Catherine Bell was cast in the lead role of Major Sarah "Mac" MacKenzie. Bellisario and CBS President Leslie Moonves "cast Catherine Bell, and [Bellisario] never heard another word from [Moonves] - who took great delight in the fact that it was part of the building block that started the CBS turnaround". On her casting, Catherine Bell stated that she "guest starred on the season finale in the first season and there was another girl playing the female lead opposite Harm [...] One of the days when I was working, he announced that the show had been canceled, but CBS picked up the show and they decided to recast the female lead. I went after the role and wrote Don a letter after I had read the breakdown for Mac and they brought me in. Six callbacks later, I got the role."

Cast and characters

Main

Also starring 
 Karri Turner as Harriet Sims, Ensign

Recurring cast (more than once this season)

Guest appearances

Episodes

See also
 1996–97 United States network television schedule

Notes

References

External links 
 Season 2 on IMDb
 Season 2 on TV.com
 Season 2 on TV Guide

02
1997 American television seasons